Ciudad Lineal is a district of Madrid, Spain.

Geography

Wards 
The district is administratively divided into nine wards:

 Atalaya
 Colina
 Concepción
 Costillares
 Pueblo Nuevo
 Quintana
 San Juan Bautista
 San Pascual
 Ventas

History 
Its name, Linear City, comes from the model of organization by the Spanish architect Arturo Soria y Mata, the linear city, based on the idea of the line. The ‘Ciudad Lineal’ takes a form of a city 400 meters wide, centered on a tramway (line 70 - closed in 1972) and a thoroughfare running in parallel. The main street in the district has his name, calle de Arturo Soria. The city is the current headquarters for the flag carrier airline of Spain, Iberia.   Mariano Belmás Estrada was one of the main architects in the early days.

References

External links 

 
Districts of Madrid
Planned cities in Spain